Toy Terriers are a group of toy breeds of dog. Breeds within this group include:

English Toy Terrier (Black & Tan)
Japanese Terrier
Miniature Bull Terrier
Miniature Fox Terrier
Rat Terrier
Russian Toy
Silky Terrier
Toy Fox Terrier
Toy Manchester Terrier
Yorkshire Terrier

Terriers
toy terrier